The 15th Chess Olympiad (15-ata Shahmatna olimpiada), organized by FIDE and comprising an open team tournament, as well as several other events designed to promote the game of chess, took place between September 15 and October 10, 1962, in Varna, Bulgaria.

The Soviet team with six GMs, led by world champion Botvinnik, lived up to expectations and won their sixth consecutive gold medals, with Yugoslavia and Argentina taking the silver and bronze, respectively.

Results

Preliminaries

A total of 37 teams entered the competition and were divided into four preliminary groups of eight to ten teams each. The top three from each group advanced to Final A, the teams placed 4th-6th to Final B, and the rest to Final C, where they were joined by a Bulgarian "B" team that played outside the contest. All preliminary groups as well as Finals A and B were played as round-robin tournaments, while Final C with 14 teams was played as an 11-round Swiss system tournament.

The Soviet Union took first place in group 1, well ahead of the two German teams, East with half a point more than West. Sweden, Belgium, and Spain took the places 4–6, while Norway, Turkey, and Greece finished at the bottom of the group.

Group 2 was won by the United States, while the Bulgarian hosts and Romania were tied for second place. Israel, Mongolia, and Switzerland made up the middle part of the group, while Puerto Rico and Tunisia had to settle for Final C.

Yugoslavia clinched group 3, ahead of the Netherlands and Czechoslovakia. Poland, Iceland, and Finland had to settle for Final B. Meanwhile, France, Uruguay, Luxembourg, and Cyprus finished at the bottom of the group.

Group 4 was won by Argentina, ahead of Hungary and Austria. Denmark, Cuba, and England made up the middle part of the group, while Albania, India, Iran, and Ireland completed the field.

 Group 1: 

 Group 2:

 Group 3:

 Group 4:

Final

{| class="wikitable"
|+ Final A
! # !!Country !! Players !! Points !! MP
|-
| style="background:gold;"|1 ||  || Botvinnik, Petrosian, Spassky, Keres, Geller, Tal || 31½ || 
|-
| style="background:silver;"|2 ||  || Gligorić, Trifunović, Matanović, Ivkov, Parma, Minić || 28 || 
|-
| style="background:#cc9966;"|3 ||  || Najdorf, Bolbochán, Panno, Sanguineti, Rossetto, Foguelman || 26 || 
|-
| 4 ||  || Fischer, Benko, Evans, R. Byrne, D. Byrne, Mednis || 25 || 
|-
| 5 ||  || Portisch, Szabó, Bilek, Barcza, Lengyel, Honfi || 23 || 
|-
| 6 ||  || Padevsky, Tringov, Minev, Kolarov, Milev, Popov || 21½ || 
|-
| 7 ||  || Unzicker, Darga, Schmid, Tröger, Hecht, Mohrlok || 21 || 
|-
| 8 ||  || Uhlmann, Pietzsch, Malich, Zinn, Fuchs, Liebert || 20½ || 10
|-
| 9 ||  || Ciocâltea, Ghițescu, Gheorghiu, Soós, Radovici, Günsberger || 20½ || 9
|-
| 10 ||  || Filip, Pachman, Hort, Fichtl, Blatný, Trapl || 18½ || 
|-
| 11 ||  || Euwe, Donner, Bouwmeester, Langeweg, Prins, Kramer || 18 || 
|-
| 12 ||  || Robatsch, Dückstein, Beni, Gragger, Kinzel, Lokvenc || 10½ || 
|}

{| class="wikitable"
|+ Final B
! # !! Country !! Players !! Points !! MP !! MW !! HTH
|-
| 13 ||  || Pomar, del Corral, Puig Pulido, Franco Raymundo, Ridameya Tatche, Serra Olives || 26½ || 16 ||  || 
|-
| 14 ||  || Penrose, Clarke, Golombek, Littlewood, Barden, Wade || 26½ || 14 ||  || 
|-
| 15 ||  || Porat, Aloni, Czerniak, Kraidman, Domnitz, Szapiro || 25 ||  ||  || 
|-
| 16 ||  || Jiménez, Cobo Arteaga, García, Ortega, Calero || 22½ || 12 ||  || 
|-
| 17 ||  || Johansson, Sköld, Nilsson, Buskenström, Olsson, Söderborg || 22½ || 11 || 4 || 2½
|-
| 18 ||  || Śliwa, Balcerowski, Doda, Tarnowski, Schmidt, Filipowicz || 22½ || 11 || 4 || 1½
|-
| 19 ||  || O'Kelly, Dunkelblum, Limbos, Boey, De Rijcke || 22 ||  ||  || 
|-
| 20 ||  || Ojanen, Raisa, Rantanen, Niemelä, Westerinen, Fred || 20½ ||  ||  || 
|-
| 21 ||  || Purevzhav, Möömöö, Myagmarsuren, Chalkhasuren, Tsagan T., Namzhil  || 20 || 9 || 3 || 
|-
| 22 ||  || Blau, Castagna, Roth, Gebauer, Luginbühl || 20 || 9 || 2 || 
|-
| 23 ||  || Ólafsson, Guðmundsson, Pálsson, Thorsteinsson, Torvaldsson, Kristinsson || 19 ||  ||  || 
|-
| 24 ||  ||Kølvig, Holm, From, Søby, Korning, Brinck-Claussen  || 17 ||  ||  || 
|}

{| class="wikitable"
|+ Final C
! # !! Country !! Players !! Points !! MP
|-
| 25 ||  || Johannessen, Lindblom, Hoen, Vinje-Gulbrandsen, Zwaig, Stensholt || 32½ || 
|-
| - ||  "B" || Filipov, Karastoichev, Daskalov, Bogdanov, Chipev, Burkhanlarsky || 29½ || 
|-
| 26 ||  || Pustina, Duraku, Konçi, Veizaj, Siliqi, Omari || 28½ || 17
|-
| 27 ||  || Belkadi, Lagha, Kchouk, Kahia, Mohsen, Ennigrou || 28½ || 16
|-
| 28 ||  || Aaron, Sakhalkar, Ali, Hassan, Nawab, Shukla || 26½ || 
|-
| 29 ||  || Hemmasian, Farboud, Parniani, Safvat, Zandifar || 25 || 
|-
| 30 ||  || Boutteville, Bergraser, Thiellement, Noradounguian, Ferry, Ravinet P. || 23½ || 
|-
| 31 ||  || Colón Romero A., Rivera D., Navas, Reissmann, Colón Romero M., Prieto Azúar, Rabell Méndez || 22½ || 
|-
| 32 ||  || Estrada Degrandi, Etcheverry, Alvarez del Monte, Bauzá, Silva Nazzari || 22 || 
|-
| 33 ||  || Kokkoris, Anastasopoulos, Papapostolou, Vizantiadis, Paidousis, Hadziotis || 18½ || 
|-
| 34 ||  || Conrady, Philippe, Schneider, Zeyen, Aloyse Neu, Leners || 18 || 
|-
| 35 ||  || Süer, Boysan, Akakinci, Günsav || 17 || 
|-
| 36 ||  || Reid, Murphy P., Reilly, Loughrey, O'Hare, Cassidy || 14½ || 
|-
| 37 ||  || Kleopas, Lantsias, Ioannidis, Fieros || 1½ || 
|}

Final «A»

Final «B»

Final «C»

Individual medals

 Board 1:  Friðrik Ólafsson 14 / 18 = 77.8%
 Board 2:  Tigran Petrosian 10 / 12 = 83.3%
 Board 3:  Boris Spassky 11 / 14 = 78.6%
 Board 4:  Borislav Ivkov and  Raúl Sanguineti 13½ / 16 = 84.4%
 1st reserve:  Efim Geller 10½ / 12 = 87.5%
 2nd reserve:  Mikhail Tal 10 / 13 = 76.9%

At the other end of the spectrum, Milton Ioannidis of Cyprus lost all of his 20 games, the worst score ever of any player at any Olympiad.

References

15th Chess Olympiad: Varna 1962 OlimpBase

15th Chess Olympiad
Olympiad 15
Chess Olympiad 15
Olympiad 15
1962 in Bulgarian sport